Kosmas Gkezos (born 15 August 1992) is a Greek professional footballer who plays as a centre-back for Austrian Bundesliga club Austria Klagenfurt.

Personal life
Gezos' younger brother, Polydoros, is also a professional footballer.

References

1992 births
Living people
Footballers from Athens
Greek footballers
Association football defenders
Super League Greece players
2. Liga (Austria) players
Austrian Football Bundesliga players
Panionios F.C. players
A.O. Glyfada players
Acharnaikos F.C. players
Akropolis IF players
SK Austria Klagenfurt players
Greek expatriate footballers
Greek expatriate sportspeople in Sweden
Expatriate footballers in Sweden